Nathaniel Stephen Jarvis (born 20 October 1991) is a Welsh-born Antigua and Barbuda international footballer who plays as a striker for Taunton Town. He was previously with Cardiff City as a youngster.

Early life
As a teenager, Jarvis grew up in Culverhouse Cross area of Cardiff and attended Ysgol Gymraeg Plasmawr.

Club career

Cardiff City
Born in Cardiff, Jarvis began his career with his home town side Cardiff City, joining their academy at an early age of 8. Alongside Ibrahim Farah he signed schoolboy forms at the start of the 2008–09 season. Having finished as top scorer for the under-18 side during the 2009–10 season, he was named as a first team substitute in several matches at the start of the following year.

Southend United

On 24 September 2010, Jarvis joined Football League Two side Southend United on a one-month loan deal after impressing in a reserve match, making his professional debut as a substitute in place of Blair Sturrock during a 3–1 win over Hereford United. He went on to make a total of seven appearances in all competitions before returning to Cardiff.

Back to Cardiff
On 23 May 2011, Jarvis was offered his first professional contract by Cardiff City alongside Alex Evans and Ibrahim Farah. Jarvis scored his first professional goal in his competitive debut against Oxford United on 10 August 2011 in the League Cup by a 20-yard lobbed header.

On 9 September, Jarvis joined Conference National neighbours Newport County initially on a month-long loan. He made his debut the following day against Mansfield Town which County lost 5–0. Jarvis scored his first goal for Newport, against Barrow on 24 September. In January 2012 Jarvis rejoined Newport County on loan until the end of the 2011–12 season. On 12 May 2012 he played for Newport in the FA Trophy Final at Wembley Stadium which Newport lost 2–0 to York City.

On 20 November 2012, Jarvis joined Forest Green Rovers on loan until 5 January. He made his Forest Green debut on 8 December 2012, in a 1–1 draw with Macclesfield Town.

On 31 January 2013, 21-year-old Jarvis joined Kidderminster Harriers from Championship Leaders Cardiff City until the end of the season., the Harriers failed to gain promotion despite being top for most of Jarvis' loan spell. Following his return to Cardiff, the club told him he would not be offered a new contract.

Brackley Town
He signed for Brackley Town following his departure from Cardiff.

Bath City
In December 2013, he joined Bath City on a non-contract deal.

Gloucester City
Just a month later however, in January 2014, he joined Gloucester City. After a period on loan at Cirencester Town, he joined them in September 2014 on a permanent deal.

Chippenham Town
In June 2018, he joined National League South side Chippenham Town.

Barry Town United
In June 2020 Jarvis joined Barry Town United.

Taunton Town
In June 2022, Jarvis signed for newly promoted National League South Side Taunton Town.

International career
Jarvis was asked to link up with the Antigua and Barbuda senior team on 1 September 2011 to play Curaçao and US Virgin Islands, who he qualifies for because of his grandfather. He was one of eight overseas based players who committed to represent the country in the summer of 2014. making his debut for the Antigua and Barbuda during 2014 Caribbean Cup qualification. He scored his first international goal on 5 September 2014 against the Dominican Republic.

International goals
Scores and results list Antigua and Barbuda's goal tally first.

Honours
Newport County
FA Trophy runner-up: 2011–12

References

External links
 
 

1991 births
Living people
Footballers from Cardiff
Welsh people of Antigua and Barbuda descent
British sportspeople of Antigua and Barbuda descent
Antigua and Barbuda people of British descent
Black British sportspeople
Welsh footballers
Antigua and Barbuda footballers
Gloucester City A.F.C. players
Association football forwards
Cardiff City F.C. players
Southend United F.C. players
Newport County A.F.C. players
Forest Green Rovers F.C. players
Bath City F.C. players
English Football League players
National League (English football) players
Brackley Town F.C. players
Antigua and Barbuda international footballers
Cirencester Town F.C. players
Hungerford Town F.C. players
Southern Football League players
2014 Caribbean Cup players
Cymru Premier players
Barry Town United F.C. players
Taunton Town F.C. players